Terry Lartey Sanniez (born 10 August 1996) is a Dutch professional footballer who plays as a right-back for Eredivisie club NEC.

Club career 

Lartey Sanniez is a youth product of AFC Ajax. He made his professional debut at Jong Ajax on 25 January 2015 in an Eerste Divisie game against Sparta Rotterdam. He replaced Elton Acolatse after 57 minutes in a 6–0 away defeat.

On 31 August 2021, Lartey Sanniez signed a two-year contract with Slovenian PrvaLiga side Celje.

On 31 August 2022, he signed a one-year deal with NEC. He made his Eredivisie debut on 16 September 2022, replacing Magnus Mattsson in the 76th minute of a 0–0 away draw against FC Utrecht.

International career
Born in the Netherlands, Lartey Sanniez is of Ghanaian descent. Between 2010 and 2016, he was a youth international for the Netherlands and represented the country at all levels from under-15 to under-21.

References

External links
 

1996 births
Living people
Footballers from Amsterdam
Dutch people of Ghanaian descent
Dutch footballers
Dutch expatriate footballers
Association football fullbacks
Netherlands youth international footballers
Netherlands under-21 international footballers
AFC Ajax players
Jong Ajax players
NEC Nijmegen players
NK Celje players
Eerste Divisie players
Slovenian PrvaLiga players
Eredivisie players
Dutch expatriate sportspeople in Slovenia
Expatriate footballers in Slovenia